Malalay Institute of Higher Education (Pashto:ملالۍ د لوړو زده کړو مؤسسه / Persian:مؤسسه تحصیلات عالی ملالی) is a private university established in 2012 located in Kandahar, Afghanistan.

It began its operation in a country that was experiencing privatization in higher education for the first time, The Institute quickly became one of the largest private higher education institutions in the city.

Malalay Institute currently offers Medical, Law-Political Science at the undergraduate level,

History 
Malalay Institute of Higher Education was established by a group of professors and lecturers from national and international universities, for filling need of higher education in the region.

The vision of this institute was to provide quality education to the down-trodden and the underprivileged segments of society. The vision seemed adventurous given the difficult situation in the country and very meager resources. However, now after 4 years of continued institutional survival and the demonstration of expansion and growth, it has been obvious that MIHE has well started moving forward towards a successful future of further striving for progressive social development.

Faculties 
Faculty of Medical, having six departments, faculty of Law and Political science that also has two departments.

Library 
The library has more than 100000 Pashto, Dari, and English books for students in hard and soft copies.

References 

Universities in Afghanistan
Kandahar
Private universities in Afghanistan
2012 establishments in Afghanistan
Educational institutions established in 2012